The 1979–80 Idaho Vandals men's basketball team represented the University of Idaho during the 1979–80 NCAA Division I men's basketball season. The Vandals were led by second-year head coach Don Monson and played their home games on campus at the Kibbie Dome in 

After five consecutive seasons in last place in the Big Sky Conference, the Vandals were expected by most to stay  but climbed up to second in the final standings and qualified for the four-team conference tournament for the first 

In non-conference games, the Vandals fell to Oregon State, Washington, and neighbor Washington State, but had wins over  Penn State, Oregon, and Nebraska. The Cornhuskers traveled to the Kibbie Dome in early  led by former Vandal head coach Joe Cipriano, stricken with cancer. The attendance was 5,500, the second-largest attendance for basketball on campus at 

An NIT invitation was likely if they won their first game of the Big Sky tourney at Ogden, Utah (and an NCAA tourney berth with two wins).

The Vandals met Montana in the semifinals, whom they had swept in the regular season, but lost the third meeting on the neutral court. Sensing that Montana was a less formidable opponent in the finals for host Weber State, the Ogden fans sided with Montana and the Grizzlies outscored the Vandals 16–2 in the final five minutes and won by  The loss in the semifinals cost them an NIT bid; Idaho missed the postseason and finished at  It was their best season in seventeen years, since Gus Johnson packed Northwest gyms and led the Vandals to a  record in 1963, Cipriano's final season as 

The overtime loss to Boise State on January 12 was the last home defeat for the Vandals for over three years, until

Notes
Senior Don Newman was a unanimous selection to the all-conference  and the player of the year. He played professional football in Canada for several seasons and later was a basketball coach in the college and NBA ranks. Forward Reed Jaussi went to medical school, served as a flight surgeon in the Air Force, and is an ophthalmologist in 

Monson and the freshmen (Brian Kellerman, Phil Hopson, and reserve Ben Ross) led Idaho to the best four-year stretch in program history. Kellerman was the player of the year (and state champion) in Washington as a high school senior in 1979, and was a four-year starter at Idaho. He was first-team all-conference for three years (honorable mention as a freshman), and was the Big Sky player of the year as a sophomore.

Roster

Schedule and results

|-
!colspan=9 style=| Big Sky tournament

References

External links
Sports Reference – Idaho Vandals: 1979–80 basketball season
Gem of the Mountains: 1980 University of Idaho yearbook – 1979–80 basketball season
Idaho Argonaut – student newspaper – 1980 editions

Idaho Vandals men's basketball seasons
Idaho
Idaho
Idaho